Steven Law may refer to:

Htun Myint Naing or Steven Law, Burmese businessman and son of Lo Hsing Han
Steven J. Law, American attorney and Republican Party fundraiser
Stephen Law (born 1960), philosopher and lecturer